Roberto Girón Mendoza, 49, and Pedro Castillo, 39, were two Guatemalan men convicted of murder and executed, with their deaths by firing squad occurring on 13 September 1996. It was the first official firing squad execution in Guatemala since 1983. It was also the first execution to occur in Latin America, with the exception of Guyana and the Caribbean, in a span of over ten years.

The executions occurred outside of the Canada Penal Farm (Granja de Canadá), in Escuintla, Guatemala. The men had raped and murdered four-year-old Sonia Marisol Álvarez García on 19 April 1993. The execution was broadcast on live television.

The men survived the initial volleys of bullets, so after a doctor had confirmed they were alive a squad leader killed each man by firing a bullet into their heads. The resulting controversy caused the Guatemalan legislature to change the method of execution to lethal injection.

Their executions were filmed by the press and featured in the 1998 shockumentary film, Banned from Television.

See also
 Capital punishment in Guatemala
Other executions:
 Manuel Martínez Coronado
 Amilcar Cetino Perez and Tomas Cerrate Hernandez

References

External links
Rico, Maite. "Fusilados dos campesinos que violaron y asesinaron a una niña guatemalteca" (Archive). El País. September 14, 1996.
"Fusilaron a dos campesinos que violaron y mataron a una nena" (Archive). Clarín. Saturday September 14, 1996. 
"Guatemala - Two men executed for rape and murder - 1996 ." Associated Press. Uploaded July 21, 2015.
Video of the execution: "Los últimos fusilados en Guatemala ." SinReservas Guatevisión. January 14, 2014. 

1996 deaths
Filmed executions
20th-century criminals
20th-century executions by Guatemala
People executed for murder
People convicted of murder by Guatemala
Guatemalan people convicted of murder
Guatemalan murderers of children
Executed Guatemalan people
People executed by firing squad